The eighteenth edition of the South American Championship was held in Santiago, Chile from 14 January to 28 February. This tournament was an extra edition, with no trophy handed to the winners, but considered official by CONMEBOL.

The participating countries were Argentina, Bolivia, Brazil, Chile, Colombia (for the first time), Ecuador, and Uruguay. Paraguay and Peru withdrew from the tournament.

Squads
For a complete list of participating squads see: 1945 South American Championship squads

Venues

Final round
Each team played against each of the other teams. Two points were awarded for a win, one point for a draw and zero points for a defeat.

Result

Goal scorers

6 goals

  Norberto Méndez
  Heleno

5 goals

  Ademir
  Juan Alcántara
  Atilio García

4 goals

  Rinaldo Martino
  René Pontoni
  Guillermo Clavero
  Víctor Aguayo

3 goals

  Desiderio Medina
  Roberto Porta

2 goals

  Vicente de la Mata
  Ferraro
  Loustau
  Jair
  Zizinho
  Roberto Gámez
  González Rubio
  Fulgencio Berdugo
  José García

1 goal

  Mario Boyé
  Manuel Pelegrina
  Raúl Fernández
  Zenón González
  Severo Orgaz
  Jaime
  Jorginho
  Rui
  Tesourinha
  Francisco Hormazábal
  Manuel Piñeiro
  Erasmo Vera
  Arturo Mendoza
  Guillermo Albornoz
  José L. Mendoza
  José M. Jiménez
  Luis A. Mendoza
  Enrique Raymondi 
  Nicolás Falero
  José M. Ortiz
  Juan P. Riephoff
  Varela

External links

 South American Championship 1945 at RSSSF

 
1945
South
1945
1945 in South American football
1945 in Argentine football
1945 in Brazilian football
1945 in Bolivian sport
1945 in Ecuador
1945 in Uruguayan football
1945 in Colombian football
January 1945 sports events in South America
February 1945 sports events in South America
Sports competitions in Santiago
1940s in Santiago, Chile